Elma van Haren (born 29 August 1954) is a Dutch poet.

Career 

In 1988, she made her debut as poet with Reis naar het welkom geheten. She won the very first C. Buddingh'-prijs for this collection of poems. She went on to publish various poem collections including De wankel (1989), Het schuinvallend oog (1991) and Grondstewardess (1996). In 1997, she received the Jan Campert Prize for Grondstewardess.

Her poem Het schitterende from her work Eskimoteren was selected as one of the three best poems of the year 2000.

She made her debut in children's poetry with De wiedeweerga (1998). In 2012, she made her debut in prose with the collections of stories Walsen. Van Haren's first novel Mevrouw OVO was published in 2017.

Her work is published by publishing company Uitgeverij De Harmonie.

Publications 

 Reis naar het welkom geheten (1988)
 De wankel (1989)
 Het schuinvallend oog (1991)
 Grondstewardess (1996)
 De wiedeweerga (1998)
 Eskimoteren (2000)
 Het Krakkemik (2003)
 Zacht gat in broekzak (2005)
 Flitsleemte (2009)
 Likmevestje (2011)
 Walsen (2012)
 Mevrouw OVO (2017)
 Zuurstofconfetti (2018)

References

External links 
 Elma van Haren (in Dutch), Uitgeverij De Harmonie
 Elma van Haren (in Dutch), Digital Library for Dutch Literature

1954 births
Living people
Dutch women poets
Dutch children's writers
Dutch women children's writers
20th-century Dutch women writers
21st-century Dutch women writers
C. Buddingh' Prize winners
People from Roosendaal